Claes Henrik Bertilsson (born 16 October 1969) is a Swedish former professional footballer who played as a forward. Andersson played for Falkenbergs, Halmstad, Martigues and Örgryte. He also appeared once for the Sweden national team in 1993.

He finished his career in October 2002 with Falkenbergs FF, when the team was promoted to Superettan.

Honours
Halmstad
Allsvenskan: 2000
Individual
 Allsvenskan top scorer: 1993 (shared with Mats Lilienberg)

References

External links

1969 births
Living people
Allsvenskan players
Superettan players
Ligue 1 players
Halmstads BK players
Falkenbergs FF players
FC Martigues players
Örgryte IS players
Swedish footballers
Swedish expatriate footballers
Expatriate footballers in France
Association football forwards